Merchet (also: -ett, -ete, -eit, -eat, -iett, -i(e)te, -iatte, mershet(e), marchet, -eit, market) was a fine paid on a marriage during the Middle Ages in England. The word derives from the plural form of daughter, merched, in old Welsh. Merchet was payment to a peasant's lord, whether by the persons marrying, or by a father for his son or daughter, or by a brother for his sister. There are also records of young Medieval women working in service away from home having saved money to pay a merchet fee for the right to choose their marriage partner. Theories regarding the practice include recompense for the loss of a worker. The etymology of the term may be sought not in the root of any word having reference to maids or daughters in particular, but in the root of an unknown word having reference to blood, to purchase, to redemption or enfranchisement, or the price paid for it, or to a particular kind of tax, fine, impost, or exaction.

See also
Mercheta Mulierum, custom on Scottish island of Ulva

References

Feudal duties
Marriage, unions and partnerships in England
Economy of medieval England